Szudziałowo  is a village in Sokółka County, Podlaskie Voivodeship, in north-eastern Poland, close to the border with Belarus. It is the seat of the gmina (administrative district) called Gmina Szudziałowo.

The village has a population of 650.

References

Villages in Sokółka County
Grodno Governorate
Białystok Voivodeship (1919–1939)
Belastok Region